Safe passage (German: Geleitrecht) is the escorting of travellers or goods in the Holy Roman Empire.
Safe Passage may also refer to:

Safe Passage (charity), a non-profit organization based in Yarmouth, Maine, U.S.A., supporting families in Guatemala City
Safe Passage (film), a 1994 film (based on Ellyn Bache's novel) starring Susan Sarandon
Palestinian freedom of movement#Gaza—West Bank Safe Passage, a safe route for Palestinians between Gaza and the West Bank

See also
Passage (disambiguation)
Safe conduct, a document issued in time of war or conflict which grants passage to an enemy alien without harassment